Me and You or Me & U may refer to:

Music
 Me and You (band), a Jamaican reggae duo

Albums 
 Me and You (Big Scary album), 2022
 Me and You (Count Basie album), 1983
 Me and You (Jeanie Tracy album), or the title song, 1982
 Me and You (Kenny Chesney album), or the title song (see below), 1996
 Me and You (VAST album), 2009
 Me and You, by Snowglobe, 2008

Songs 
 "Me and You" (Alexia song), 1995
 "Me and You" (Camouflage song), 2003
 "Me and You" (Egg Hunt song), 1986
 "Me and You" (Emtee song), 2017
 "Me and You" (Kenny Chesney song), 1995
 "Me & You" (Nero song), 2011
 "Me & U", by Cassie, 2005
 "Me + You", by Monica, 2019
 "Me and You", by Archive from Noise
 "Me & You", by Belle Perez
 "Me & U", by Big Ed from Special Forces
 "Me & U", by Cali Swag District from The Kickback
 "Me & You", by Ceres from We Are a Team
 "Me & You", by Diana Vickers from Songs from the Tainted Cherry Tree
 "Me & U", by Flo Rida from Mail on Sunday
 "ME+U", by f(x) from Nu ABO
 "Me and You", by Jake Bugg from Shangri La
 "Me and U", by Kandi Burruss from Kandi Koated
 "Me & You", by Lumidee from Almost Famous
 "Me and U", by Montell Jordan from Let It Rain
 "Me & You", by Nadine Lustre from Nadine Lustre
 "Me and You", by Nolwenn Leroy from Le Cheshire Cat et moi
 "Me & U", by PnB Rock from TrapStar Turnt PopStar
 "Me and You", by Poco from Indian Summer
 "Me and You", by Ringo Starr from Choose Love
 "Me and You", by She & Him from Volume Two
 "Me and You", by Slow Club
 "Me + You", by Super Cruel
 "Me and You", by Tony! Toni! Toné! from the Boyz n the Hood film soundtrack
 "Me and You", by Tyler James Williams and Coco Jones from the Let It Shine film soundtrack

Other uses
Me and You (novel) (Io e te), a 2010 novel by Niccolò Ammaniti
 Me and You (film) (Io e te), a 2012 Italian film directed by Bernardo Bertolucci, based on Ammaniti's novel

See also
 You and Me (disambiguation)
Me, You and Him, British television show